Richard Newsham (died 1743) was an English inventor. He took out two patents for fire engines in 1721 and 1725 (Royal Patent Office 1721 patent #439 and 1725 patent #479) and soon dominated the fire engine market in England. The engine had two single-acting pistons and an air vessel placed in a tank which formed the frame of the machine. The pump was worked by people at the long cross handles. At the front of the engine, protected by a sheet of horn and a door, were directions for keeping the machine in order. New York City imported its first two fire engines from Newsham in 1731. In 1737 Newsham made a manual fire pump for the Parish of Bray in Berkshire.

When Richard Newsham died in 1743 the company was willed to his son Lawrence Newsham. When Lawrence died in 1747 he bequeathed the company to his widow and his cousin George Ragg and the company became Newsham and Ragg.

See also
 Fire apparatus
 History of fire fighting
 Brief origin of American LaFrance fire engines.

References

External links
 Information on a Newsham engine in the collections of Colonial Williamsburg in Williamsburg, Virginia
 Basic information about Newsham and some other early hand tubs

English inventors
History of firefighting
Year of birth missing
1743 deaths